King House may refer to:

in the Republic of Ireland
 King House (Boyle, Ireland), Boyle, County Roscommon

in the United States
(by state, then town)
 King House (Montevallo, Alabama), listed on the National Register of Historic Places (NRHP) in Shelby County
 David L. King House, Hardy, Arkansas, listed on the NRHP in Sharp County
 Hugh L. King House, Heber Springs, Arkansas, listed on the NRHP in Cleburne County, Arkansas
 King-Neimeyer-Mathis House, Hot Springs, Arkansas, listed on the NRHP in Garland County
 Dr. Alexander T. King House and Carriage House, Pueblo, Colorado, listed on the NRHP in Pueblo County
 George King House, Sharon, Connecticut, listed on the NRHP in Litchfield County, Connecticut
 Alexander King House, Suffield, Connecticut, listed on the NRHP in Hartford County
 Dr. Willard Van Orsdel King House, Fort Lauderdale, Florida, NRHP-listed
 John A. King House, Lake Butler, Florida, NRHP-listed
 King House, Mayport, Florida
 King-Hooton House, Pensacola, Florida, NRHP-listed
 Tandy King House, Fayetteville, Georgia, listed on the NRHP in Fayette County, Georgia
 King-Knowles-Gheesling House, Greensboro, Georgia, listed on the NRHP in Greene County
 Patrick J. King House, Chicago, Illinois, NRHP-listed
 King-Dennis Farm, Centerville, Indiana, listed on the NRHP in Wayne County
 M. J. King House, Shelbyville, Kentucky, listed on the NRHP in Shelby County
 Gov. William King House, Bath, Maine, listed on the NRHP in Sagadahoc County, Maine
 King House (Newton, Massachusetts), NRHP-listed
 King-McBride Mansion, Virginia City, Nevada, also known as King House, NRHP-listed
 King Store and Homestead, Ledgewood, New Jersey, NRHP-listed
 King's Carriage House, New York, New York
 King Manor, New York, New York, NRHP-listed
 Polaski King House, Syracuse, New York, NRHP-listed
 Dr. Franklin King House-Idlewild, Eden, North Carolina, listed on the NRHP in Rockingham County
 King-Waldrop House, Hendersonville, North Carolina, listed on the NRHP in Henderson County
 King-Casper-Ward-Bazemore House, Ahoskie, North Carolina, listed on the NRHP in Hertford County
 King-Freeman-Speight House, Republican, North Carolina, listed on the NRHP in Bertie County
 King-Flowers-Keaton House, Statesville, North Carolina, listed on the NRHP in Iredell County
 King House (Windsor, North Carolina), listed on the NRHP in Bertie County
 William King House (Canal Winchester, Ohio), listed on the National Register of Historic Places in Franklin County
 Dr. King House, Fredericktown, Ohio, listed on the NRHP in Knox County
 George W. King Mansion-Etowah, Marion, Ohio, listed on the NRHP in Marion County
 King-Phillips-Deibel House, Medina, Ohio, listed on the NRHP in Medina County
 Charles King House, Philomath, Oregon, NRHP-listed
 Isaac King House and Barn, Philomath, Oregon, NRHP-listed
 Samuel W. King House, Portland, Oregon, NRHP-listed
 Edward King House, Newport, Rhode Island, NRHP-listed
 Edward Washington King House, Bristol, Tennessee, listed on the NRHP in Sullivan County
 King Homestead, Cottontown, Tennessee, NRHP-listed
 Edward Moody King House, Dyersburg, Tennessee, listed on the NRHP in Tennessee
 William King House (Franklin, Tennessee), NRHP-listed
King Ranch, Nueces County, Texas, NRHP-listed
 Richard King House, Corpus Christi, Texas, listed on the NRHP in Nueces County
 Mrs. J. C. King House, McKinney, Texas, listed on the NRHP in Collin County
 King-Lancaster-McCoy-Mitchell House, Bristol, Virginia, NRHP-listed
 King-Runkle House, Charlottesville, Virginia, NRHP-listed
 F.S. King Brothers Ranch Historic District, Laramie, Wyoming, listed on the NRHP in Albany County

See also
King's House (disambiguation)
William King House (disambiguation)